Elijah McClanahan (April 20, 1770 – December 1, 1857) (aka Elijah McClanachan; McClanechan, etc.) was a noted planter and soldier in western Virginia and the Roanoke Valley. He was a Lieutenant Colonel in the 5th/121st Virginia Militia in the War of 1812, and was one of the largest landholders in what later became Roanoke County, Virginia.

Early life
Elijah McClanahan was the son of William and Sarah Neely McClanahan, along with three brothers: John, James and Green.
He was also very generous, and probably already had the Smallpox, because at the age of 13, on October 10, 1783, he was "...allowed five pounds for attending a Continental soldier with the small pox." By the age of 22, he was granted a license to keep an ordinary or Tavern in their house.

Elijah McClanahan married on September 3, 1795, Agatha Strother Lewis (born March 15, 1779, and died June 14, 1852), granddaughter of Colonel Andrew Lewis (soldier), who then lived on Bent Mountain, Virginia. They had twelve children: 1. Elizabeth; married Dr. Gabriel Nash; second husband was Dr. Cox, of Missouri; offspring, several children. 2. Sallie; married Edward White, brother of Alexander White, of Fort Lewis; offspring, seven children. 3. Mary; married R. D. Montague; offspring, five. She was mother-in-law of Judge George Junkin, whose son, William Junkin, is now (1894) missionary in Corea. 4. Agnes; married Dr. John Ingles; offspring, four, one of whom is Mrs. Colonel Thomas Lewis, of Roanoke. 5. Lucy; married William Johnston; offspring, six. 6. Nancy; married Colin Bass. 7. Catharine; married Thomas Ingles; offspring, five. 8. Fannie; married Thomas Micou, of Essex County, Virginia; second husband, Rev. Charles Miller; grandmother of Rev. W. McC. Miller; offspring, five. 9. Jane; married Rev. J. N. Lewis; offspring, two. 10. Peggy; died young. 11. William; engaged to marry Patsy Lewis; both died from fever without having married. 12. Andrew.

War of 1812
On August 11, 1795, he took an oath of Captain of the Virginia militia.

With the organization of the 5th Virginia Militia, Elijah McClanahan was promoted to Lieutenant colonel (United States). He is also listed as the Lieutenant Colonel of the 121st Regiment, Virginia Militia, during the War of 1812.

Post war
He was a substantial landowner in Virginia, and "Colonel Elijah McClanahan was the owner of most of the land that ultimately became the Northwest section of Roanoke City (Roanoke, Virginia)." As early as 1798, he purchased along with his partner and father-in-law, Colonel Andrew Lewis (soldier), two plots of land of 92 and 84 acres each along the Little River (New River) in Montgomery County, Virginia.

He is credited with owning over 1,500 acres, and with farm holdings valued at over $75,000.

When the county was formed in 1830, Elijah McClanahan was appointed the sheriff by the governor. "In those days, the duties of the sheriff were somewhat different than they are today. He was charged with collecting taxes, preparing a list of "insolvents", and keeping the jail. His salary was paid through the collection of fees."

Colonel McClanahan served as a justice when Roanoke County, Virginia, was formed from part of Botetourt County, Virginia. He later was appointed the first high sheriff. "He was also among the trustees chosen at the founding of the town of Salem, among the founding elders of Salem Presbyterian Church (Salem, Virginia), and one of the largest landholders in the county."

Elijah McClanahan was one of the justices of the county court in 1838, 1852 and 1856.

Roads
"Elijah McClanahan, Elias thomas, Lewis Harvey and William McDermed were appointed commissioners to lay off public roads in the county into properr and suitable districts, along with allocating the tithables."
Elijah McClananhan was also prominently involved in the Allegheny Turnpike Company, and early turnpike in western Virginia that became part of the Valley Pike, and eventually U.S. Route 11 in Virginia.

Villa Heights Home
Elijah McClanahan built a home in 1820. "Built in 1820, the house was owned by Lt. Col. Elijah McClanahan, a War of 1812 veteran. The original Federal architecture was renovated in the early 20th century with Classical revival features on the interior and exterior and has been known as the Compton-Bateman house." This property was later to be known as part of the Villa Heights, Roanoke, Virginia neighborhood in Roanoke, Virginia. Originally named "Long Meadow" by Col. McClanahan, over the years the name of the house was known as "Villa Heights", from which the neighborhood was named, to the Compton-Bateman house, as it is known today.

"The original dwelling of Villa Heights, built by Elijah McClanahan in 1820, was a comparatively modest Federal style house, compared to its 20th century evolution. However, it was still quite a substantial house for this area during the second quarter of the nineteenth century and, compared to most of the surrounding farmsteads of the time, would have been an iconic and impressive building. Character-defining features of its original Federal design included unpainted Flemish bond, load-bearing brick construction, a molded brick water table, and a five-bay facade with symmetrical fenestration and stone window sills. Today the façade also features Classical Revival detailing around the entry, notably a round-arched opening with a fanlight transom and
five-light sidelights, but it is undetermined as of yet if these were part of the original design or if they were added in a later alteration."

Death and burial
McClanahan died on December 1, 1857. He is buried with his spouse and other members of his family in the McClanahan Family Cemetery in Roanoke, Virginia.

References

Bibliography
 Breckenbridge, James. 1783–1904. Papers. Abstract: Correspondence (chiefly relating to Breckinridge's legal career and his land speculation in western Virginia and Kentucky), legal papers, deeds, militia orders and returns, receipts, accounts, and other papers. Includes description of iron works in Wythe County, Va., Mutual Assurance Society receipts, and rates charged by ordinary keepers (1770). Topics mentioned in correspondence include Virginia and U.S. politics, local elections, War of 1812, settlement of Kentucky and Tennessee, Indian wars, slavery, and Virginia militia, with specific references to formation of Kentucky government, congressional sessions of 1793-1797 and 1805–1812, the Kentucky Resolutions (1798), troubles with squatters in Indian territory, expeditions against Indians (1791 and 1813), collection of whiskey taxes, excise taxes, the national bank, internal improvements, trial of Aaron Burr, mill owned by Breckinridge, and support of two illegitimate children. Correspondents include John Breckinridge, Robert Breckinridge, William Breckinridge, Henry Clay, Francis Walker Gilmer, Peachy R. Gilmer, George Hancock, Andrew Jackson, James Madison, John Marshall, Elijah McClanahan, James McClung, Francis Preston, John Preston, William Preston, Martha Jefferson Randolph, Archibald Stuart, and Bushrod Washington.
 National Register of Historic Places Registration Form. "Villa Heights". 
 Roanoke Times. March 20, 2018. "Historic mansion in northwest Roanoke added to state landmarks register."
 White, H. M. The McClanahans. 1716. Abstract: Family history and genealogy compiled by White of the McClanahans, a Scotch-Irish family that settled in Virginia after 1716. The book describes the family's involvement in the French and Indian War and the Revolutionary War. Included is information on the Poage family.

Virginia militiamen in the American Revolution
People from Virginia in the War of 1812
People from Salem, Virginia
People from Roanoke County, Virginia
Houses in Roanoke County, Virginia
Houses in Roanoke, Virginia
1857 deaths
People from Roanoke, Virginia
American militia officers
1770 births